The Armada Memorial is a monument on Plymouth Hoe, Plymouth, Devon, England. Built in 1888, the monument celebrates the tercentenary of the defeat of the Spanish Armada, which was sighted by English captains stationed in the city. It is a granite structure, decorated with bronze crests and a statue of Britannia.

Background

The Spanish Armada (or just the Armada) was a fleet that unsuccessfully attempted a naval invasion of England. News of the Armada's approach reached Plymouth on the afternoon of 19 July and it entered into sight on 20 July. Tradition recorded that tidings of the approach 
came to the captains whilst they were playing bowls on Plymouth Hoe. Tradition also associates the following passage from Francis Drake: "There is time enough to play the game out first, and thrash the Spaniards afterwards."

In commemoration of the defeat of the Armada, it was customary for the bells of St Andrew's to ring a merry peal annually on the Saturday night preceding 25 July. This practice ended in the 19th century. A statue of Francis Drake was erected on the Hoe in 1884.

History
The foundation stone of the Armada Memorial was laid on 19 July 1888, by the Mayor of Plymouth, Henry Waring. The day was taken to celebrate the tercentenary of the first sighting of the Armada from the Hoe, but Richard Worth notes that this was actually on the 20 July. Excursion trains were run and crowds gathered for the ceremony, which was marked as a public holiday and banquet at the city's Guildhall. The memorial was inaugurated by the then Duke of Edinburgh, Alfred on 21 October 1890, with full civic pomp and imposing naval and military demonstration. The memorial became a listed building on 1 May 1975.

Architecture
The memorial was made by architect Herbert Gribble and sculptor William Charles May. The monument is sculpted of granite which frequently uses entablature and features sculptures and fittings made of bronze. The base of the monument has steps and is octagonal in shape. This supports a square plinth bearing a shield decorated with drapes and a crown. A panel shows the battle of the Armada inscribed with "HE BLEW WITH HIS WINDS AND THEY WERE SCATTERED". The tall plinth bears a wreathed medallion and a chest with a head, presumed by historian Nikolaus Pevsner to be that of Spanish admiral Sedonia. On top of the monument stands the bronze statue of Britannia (a female personification of Great Britain) with a lion. A series of cast-iron stanchions with chains act as a perimeter fence. The stone used in the memorial was quarried in Gunnislake, Cornwall and was noted as one of the whitest known granites with a close texture (in 1897).

References

External links

Buildings and structures in Plymouth, Devon
Naval monuments and memorials
British military memorials and cemeteries
Spanish Armada
Sculptures of lions
1888 sculptures
Bronze sculptures in the United Kingdom
1888 establishments in England
Grade II* listed monuments and memorials
Grade II* listed buildings in Devon